is a 1950 Japanese drama film directed by Hiroshi Shimizu.

Plot
Toshiko, mother of three children, all from different fathers, travels from Tokyo to the countryside to give them into foster care, as they get in the way to her occupation as a bar owner. After her daughter has been taken in by her brother Gentaro, himself father of eight children, and her younger son by her uncle Yokogawa, she heads for the home of her former nurse Oseki, who now runs a tea house in the mountains. On the way, Toshiko meets an elderly woman who looks after her grandchild, as her daughter, the child's mother and member of a troupe of travelling actors, refuses to give it away even under difficult circumstances. She resides at an inn with her elder son Fusao, where she falls ill and moves into a room with painter Takuoka as the inn is booked out. Mitsuko, Toshiko's business partner, pays her a visit and gets entangled with Takuoka. Toshiko eventually meets with Oseki, but instead of asking her to take Fusao in as she had originally intended, she decides to raise her children on her own, even if she will have to face financial hardships.

Cast
 Nijiko Kiyokawa as Toshiko Kamura
 Yatarō Kurokawa as Takuoka, the painter
 Musei Tokugawa as Yokogawa, Toshiko's uncle
 Roppa Furukawa as Gentaro, Toshiko's brother
 Chōko Iida as old lady
 Isuzu Yamada as Mitsuko
 Reiko Miyagawa as Fudeko, Yokogawa's daughter
 Kumeko Urabe as Oseki
 Kyōko Akemi

Legacy
A Mother's Love was screened at the Österreichische Filmmuseum in 2005 and at the Cinémathèque française in 2020 and 2021.

In its article on the Shimizu retrospective held at the Österreichische Filmmuseum, newspaper Der Standard wrote, the female protagonist's "odyssey is a process of healing–as is the complete work of Hiroshi Shimizu".

References

External links
 

1950 films
Japanese drama films
Japanese black-and-white films
Films directed by Hiroshi Shimizu
Shintoho films